Maryland's 5th congressional district comprises all of Charles, St. Mary's, and Calvert counties, as well as portions of Prince George's and Anne Arundel counties. The district is currently represented by Democrat Steny Hoyer,  who from 2007 to 2011 and from 2019 to 2023 was House Majority Leader.

History
When it was defined in 1788, the 5th Congressional District centered on Salisbury, Maryland. It consisted of the current Maryland counties of Caroline, Dorchester, Wicomico, Somerset, and Worcester.

In 1792 the boundaries of Maryland's congressional districts were redrawn, and the 5th District was made to include Baltimore and Baltimore County.

Recent election results from presidential races

Recent elections

2000s

2010s

2020s

List of members representing the district

1789–1803: One seat

1803–1833: Two seats
From 1803 to 1833, two seats were apportioned, elected at-large on a general ticket.

1833–present: One seat

Historical district boundaries

See also

Maryland's congressional districts
List of United States congressional districts

Notes

Sources 

 Archives of Maryland Historical List United States Representatives Maryland State Archives

 Congressional Biographical Directory of the United States 1774–present

05
1789 establishments in Maryland
Constituencies established in 1789